Hazama is a Japanese surname. Notable people with the surname include:

, Japanese actor in the 1996 film Mari's Prey
, Japanese voice actor and narrator
, Japanese composer and jazz musician

Fictional characters
, a fictional character from the game BlazBlue: Continuum Shift
 Hazama Itsuru, a fictional character from the anime 8 Man After
, a character in the manga series Assassination Classroom
 Kurou Hazama (間 黒男), Black Jack's true name.

See also
Hazama Ando, a Japanese construction corporation

Japanese-language surnames